Nerchinsko-Zavodsky District is an administrative and municipal district (raion), one of the thirty-one in Zabaykalsky Krai, Russia. It is located in the east and southeast of the krai, and borders with Gazimuro-Zavodsky District in the north, and Kalgansky District in the south. Its administrative center is the rural locality (a selo) of Nerchinsky Zavod. Population:  12,499 (2002 Census);  The population of Nerchinsky Zavod accounts for 26.4% of the district's total population.

History
The district was established on January 4, 1926.

References

Sources

Districts of Zabaykalsky Krai
States and territories established in 1926

